The 2023 Women's Oceania Cup will be the twelfth edition of the Women's Oceania Cup after the cancellation of the 2022 edition due to the COVID-19 pandemic, the biennial international women's field hockey championship of Oceania organised by the Oceania Hockey Federation. It will be held in August 2023.

New Zealand are the defending champions, having won the 2019 edition. The winner will qualify for the 2024 Summer Olympics.

See also
2023 Men's Oceania Cup

References

Women's Oceania Cup
Oceania Cup
Oceania Cup, 2021 Women